Arkansas Highway 79 may refer to:
Arkansas Highway 79 (1926), now numbered 115
U.S. Route 79 in Arkansas, entered Arkansas ca. 1935
U.S. Route 79 Business (Stuttgart, Arkansas) (sometimes shown as AR 79, for example on Google Maps)